Tsuen Wan Centre is one of the largest private housing estates in Tsuen Wan, New Territories, Hong Kong, located at Tsuen King Circuit. It consists of 19 high-rise buildings, with their names of a number of Chinese cities, and a shopping arcade. It was divided into 3 phases which were completed between 1980 and 1982, and was developed by Sun Hung Kai Properties.

The 19 blocks

Demographics
According to the 2016 by-census, Tsuen Wan Centre had a population of 10,742. The median age was 39.6 and the majority of residents (96.9 per cent) were of Chinese ethnicity. The average household size was 2.5 people. The median monthly household income of all households (i.e. including both economically active and inactive households) was HK$30,000.

Politics
Tsuen Wan Centre is located in Tsuen Wan Centre constituency of the Tsuen Wan District Council. It is currently represented by Li Hung-por, who was elected in the 2019 elections.

References

Tsuen Wan
Sun Hung Kai Properties
Residential buildings completed in 1982
1982 establishments in Hong Kong
Housing estates with centralized LPG system in Hong Kong